Elections to Trafford Council were held on 4 May 2000. One third of the council was up for election, with each successful candidate to serve a four-year term of office, expiring in 2004. The Labour Party held overall control of the council.

After the election, the composition of the council was as follows:

Summary

Ward results

References

2000 English local elections
2000
2000s in Greater Manchester